The mixed doubles table tennis event was part of the table tennis programme and took place between November 15 and 19, at the Guangzhou Gymnasium.

Schedule
All times are China Standard Time (UTC+08:00)

Results
Legend
WO — Won by walkover

Finals

Top half

Section 1

Section 2

Bottom half

Section 3

Section 4

References

 Official Report – Mixed Doubles

Table tennis at the 2010 Asian Games